Cotinus obovatus syn. C. americanus, the American smoketree, chittamwood or American smokewood, is a rare species of flowering plant in the genus Cotinus of the family Anacardiaceae, native to scattered locations in Oklahoma, Texas, Arkansas, Missouri, Alabama and Tennessee. It produces panicles of pink-grey flowers in summer, and its foliage turns a brilliant scarlet in autumn; considered by many to be the most intense fall color of any tree. The smokey effect derives from the clusters of hairs on the spent flower stalks. It is highly sought after and cultivated in botanical gardens worldwide. It is dioecious, with male and female flowers on separate plants.

The Latin specific epithet obovatus means "in the shape of an inverted egg", and refers to the broadly oval shape of the leaves. The heartwood is a bright yellow. The species does not appear to be in danger of facing extinction in the wild.

References

Anacardiaceae
Flora of Alabama
Flora of Arkansas
Flora of Missouri
Flora of Oklahoma
Flora of Tennessee
Flora of Texas
Dioecious plants